Teco Benson is a Nigerian film director and producer. He was nominated for Best Director at the Africa Movie Academy Awards in 2006 and 2008, and won Director of the Year at the 2011 Best of Nollywood Awards. In 2012 he was decorated by President Goodluck Jonathan of Nigeria as a Member of the Order of the Federal Republic.  He started his career as an actor in 1994 before switching to producing and directing. In 2003 he made the first Sierra Leone-made film titled Blood Diamonds.

Filmography

End of the Wicked
Red Hot
Accident
Mission to Nowhere
State of Emergency
Two Brides and a Baby
High Blood Pressure
Explosion
Executive Crime
Broad Daylight
The Price
Wasted Years
End of the Wicked
War Front
Formidable Force
Blood Diamonds
False Alarm
Terror

Six Demons
The Senator
Eye for Eye
Dirty Game
Felony
Day of Reckoning
Day of Atonement
Highway to the Grave
Grace to Grass
Danger Signal
Accidental Discharge
Silence of the Gods
Mfana Ibagha
Iku doro
The Fake Prophet
Elastic Limit
Mr & Mrs, Chapter 2

See also
 List of Nigerian actors
 List of Nigerian film producers
 List of Nigerian film directors

References

Living people
Nigerian film directors
Year of birth missing (living people)
Nigerian film award winners
Nigerian film producers
Members of the Order of the Federal Republic